Chiralla is an Indian village and a tehsil in Doda district of Jammu and Kashmir. It was formerly part of Thathri tehsil and block. This tehsil have 9 Panchayats including Bhallara, Chagsoo, Jagota, Chiralla, Panshei, Puneja, Rokali, Sunarthawa and Thallela.

Population
According to Census 2011, the total population of tehsil Chiralla is 5,502.

References

Villages in Doda district